The Residual Deposits Group is a Palaeogene to Quaternary lithostratigraphic group (a sequence of rock strata or other definable geological units) present in those parts of southern and eastern England where the Chalk outcrops and in the Buchan district of northeast Scotland.

References 

Geological groups of the United Kingdom
Geologic formations of England
Geologic formations of Scotland
Quaternary geologic formations
Paleogene System of Europe
Neogene System of Europe